Saligos is a commune in the Hautes-Pyrénées department in south-western France. On 1 January 2017, the former commune of Vizos was merged into Saligos.

See also
Communes of the Hautes-Pyrénées department

References

Communes of Hautes-Pyrénées